Sirajganj-1 is a constituency represented in the Jatiya Sangsad (National Parliament) of Bangladesh since 2014 by Mohammed Nasim of the Awami League.

Boundaries 
The constituency encompasses Kazipur Upazila and five union parishads of Sirajganj Sadar Upazila: Baghbati, Bahuli, Mechhra, Ratankandi, and Chhangachha.

History 
The constituency was created in 1984 from a Pabna constituency when the former Pabna District was split into two districts: Sirajganj and Pabna.

Ahead of the 2008 general election, the Election Commission redrew constituency boundaries to reflect population changes revealed by the 2001 Bangladesh census. The 2008 redistricting altered the boundaries of the constituency.

Ahead of the 2018 general election, the Election Commission expanded the boundaries of the constituency by adding one union parishad of Sirajganj Sadar Upazila: Bahuli.

Members of Parliament

Elections

Elections in the 2010s 
Mohammed Nasim was elected unopposed in the 2014 general election after opposition parties withdrew their candidacies in a boycott of the election.

Elections in the 2000s

Elections in the 1990s 
Mohammed Nasim stood for two seats in the June 1996 general election: Sirajganj-1 and Sirajganj-2. After winning both, he chose to represent Sirajganj-2 and quit Sirajganj-1, triggering a by-election in Sirajganj-1. Mohammad Salim of the Awami League was elected in a September by-election.

References

External links
 

Parliamentary constituencies in Bangladesh
Sirajganj District